Nathan Foley (born 8 September 1985) is a former professional Australian rules footballer who played for the Richmond Football Club in the Australian Football League (AFL).

Foley was drafted by  using pick 3 in the 2003 AFL Rookie Draft, from the Geelong Falcons.

In 2007, Foley had a break-out season, establishing himself as one of the AFL's best on-ballers. He was selected in the squad of 40 for the All-Australian team, but missed out when the official 22-man team was released in September 2007. He was runner-up in the Jack Dyer Medal count, polling only one vote behind Matthew Richardson.

In 2008, Foley was named as Richmond's deputy vice captain along with Chris Newman.

Foley retired in August 2015 citing a degenerative knee injury forcing him into immediate retirement.

Playing statistics

|- style="background-color: #EAEAEA"
! scope="row" style="text-align:center" | 2005
|
| 41 || 6 || 1 || 0 || 24 || 39 || 63 || 6 || 20 || 0.2 || 0.0 || 4.0 || 6.5 || 10.5 || 1.0 || 3.3
|-
! scope="row" style="text-align:center" | 2006
|
| 41 || 21 || 3 || 2 || 177 || 156 || 333 || 55 || 70 || 0.1 || 0.1 || 8.4 || 7.4 || 15.9 || 2.6 || 3.3
|- style="background-color: #EAEAEA"
! scope="row" style="text-align:center" | 2007
|
| 41 || 22 || 6 || 6 || 246 || 286 || 532 || 46 || 90 || 0.3 || 0.3 || 11.2 || 13.0 || 24.2 || 2.1 || 4.1
|-
! scope="row" style="text-align:center" | 2008
|
| 41 || 21 || 8 || 5 || 200 || 267 || 467 || 48 || 75 || 0.4 || 0.2 || 9.5 || 12.7 || 22.2 || 2.3 || 3.6
|- style="background-color: #EAEAEA"
! scope="row" style="text-align:center" | 2009
|
| 41 || 14 || 4 || 2 || 138 || 223 || 361 || 41 || 55 || 0.3 || 0.1 || 9.9 || 15.9 || 25.8 || 2.9 || 3.9
|-
! scope="row" style="text-align:center" | 2010
|
| 41 || 4 || 0 || 1 || 28 || 51 || 79 || 12 || 16 || 0.0 || 0.3 || 7.0 || 12.8 || 19.8 || 3.0 || 4.0
|- style="background-color: #EAEAEA"
! scope="row" style="text-align:center" | 2011
|
| 41 || 22 || 11 || 8 || 226 || 248 || 474 || 55 || 122 || 0.5 || 0.4 || 10.3 || 11.3 || 21.5 || 2.5 || 5.5
|-
! scope="row" style="text-align:center" | 2012
|
| 41 || 10 || 1 || 6 || 110 || 123 || 233 || 38 || 58 || 0.1 || 0.6 || 11.0 || 12.3 || 23.3 || 3.8 || 5.8
|- style="background-color: #EAEAEA"
! scope="row" style="text-align:center" | 2013
|
| 41 || 16 || 6 || 5 || 151 || 141 || 292 || 54 || 65 || 0.4 || 0.3 || 9.4 || 8.8 || 18.3 || 3.4 || 4.1
|-
! scope="row" style="text-align:center" | 2014
|
| 41 || 18 || 4 || 3 || 136 || 167 || 303 || 39 || 73 || 0.2 || 0.2 || 7.6 || 9.3 || 16.8 || 2.2 || 4.1
|- style="background-color: #EAEAEA"
! scope="row" style="text-align:center" | 2015
|
| 41 || 0 || — || — || — || — || — || — || — || — || — || — || — || — || — || —
|- class="sortbottom"
! colspan=3| Career
! 154
! 44
! 38
! 1436
! 1701
! 3137
! 394
! 644
! 0.3
! 0.2
! 9.3
! 11.0
! 20.4
! 2.6
! 4.2
|}

References

External links

 
 Nathan Foley (footballer)s statistics from Footy Wire

Richmond Football Club players
Colac Football Club players
Australian rules footballers from Victoria (Australia)
Geelong Falcons players
Living people
1985 births
People from Colac, Victoria
Australia international rules football team players